Steve Whiteman (born August 28, 1956) is an American rock vocalist, best known for being the lead singer of Kix.

Biography

Early years 
Whiteman first realized his love for music at a young age, as a child, he would hurry home from church to play, by ear, the hymnals he'd heard during Sunday service. He started his music career playing drums in a Led Zeppelin cover band.

Kix 
Whiteman was recruited to join Kix in 1978 while they were known as "The Shooze". Whiteman and then-drummer Donnie Spence would alternate between who would drum and who would sing until it was decided that since Whiteman could hit the harder notes that he should stay as lead singer, Spence would soon leave in 1979 and be replaced by current-drummer Jimmy "Chocolate" Chalfant. The group has released seven studio albums and one live album with Whiteman on vocals, the band went on hiatus in 1996 due to growing tensions within the band, a decline in the popularity of hard rock, and declining record sales of their album $how Bu$ine$$. Over the past 30 years he has been instrumental in keeping the band together during various personnel changes.

Funny Money and teaching 
Funny Money was formed by Whiteman and guitarist Billy Andrews after they met at a charity gig in 1996 after Kix disbanded, the group has released four studio albums and one live album since its formation and currently consists of Whiteman, Dean Cramer (one of Whiteman's vocal students), and fellow Kix alumni Jimmy Chalfant and Mark Schenker.
Whiteman also took the downtime from Kix to begin a teaching career, he would go on to teach vocals, drums, guitar, and harmonica at the Maryland Institute of Music, his vocal students include Jordan White and Lzzy Hale of Halestorm.

Reforming Kix 

In 2003, the members of Kix, sans Donnie Purnell, reformed with bassist, vocalist and songwriter Mark Schenker (originally from Centerfold) and has since released the critically acclaimed Rock Your Face Off in 2014.  This had led to a resurgence in the band's popularity and they maintain an active touring schedule throughout the country.  Although back with Kix and on a regular tour schedule, Steve Whiteman, as well as Jimmy Chalfant and Brian Forsythe, are all instructors at the Maryland Institute of Music L.L.C.  Whiteman's daughter, Carly, is also an instructor of vocals and piano there.

Discography 
Over his career, Whiteman has released 12 studio albums and 1 live album.

Solo 

Studio album

You're Welcome (2021)

With Kix

Studio albums 
 Kix (1981)
 Cool Kids (1983)
 Midnite Dynamite (1985)
 Blow My Fuse (1988)
 Hot Wire (1991)
 $how Bu$ine$$ (1995)
 Rock Your Face Off (2014)

Live albums 
 Live (1993)
 Live In Baltimore (2012)

With Funny Money

Studio albums 
 Funny Money (1998)
 Back Again (1999)
 Skin To Skin (2003)
 Stick It! (2006)

Live albums 
 Even Better... Live (2001)

Guest appearances 
 Twisted Sister – Love Is For Suckers (1987)
 Monster Metal Power Ballads (2006 — track "Still Loving You" (Scorpions cover), credited as "Still Lovin' You"
 Leppardmania: A Tribute to Def Leppard (2000 — track "Foolin'" (Def Leppard cover), credited as "Foolin'"
 Best of Both Worlds: A Tribute to Van Halen (2003 – track "There's Only One Way to Rock" (Sammy Hagar cover)
 The Song Remains Remixed – A Tribute to Led Zeppelin (1999 – track "Immigrant Song" (Led Zeppelin cover)
 Monster Ballads: Platinum Edition (2006, retail version — track "Don't Close Your Eyes")
 Monster Ballads: Platinum Edition (2005, exclusive version — track "Don't Close Your Eyes")
 Monster Ballads (1999 — track "Don't Close Your Eyes")

Videography 
Blow My Fuse: The Videos (1989)
Can't Stop the Show – The Return of KIX – A Documentary (2016)

References

External links

 Kix website
 Funny Money website

1956 births
Living people
American male singers
People from Piedmont, West Virginia